Brian Steele is an American actor who has had many roles as monsters and creatures on television and in films. In 2018, he appeared as The Robot in Lost in Space. Steele stands at 6 ft 7 in (2.01 m).

Career
On television, Steele was the third (of three) actors to play the Bigfoot called Harry in the series Harry and the Hendersons, starting in 1992, before moving on to play creatures in theatrical motion pictures, with roles like Mr. Wink in Hellboy 2: The Golden Army wearing over 130 pounds of makeup. Steele has portrayed Drake Beast in Blade: Trinity, Sammael in Hellboy, Lycan werewolves in Underworld and Underworld: Rise of the Lycans, William Corvinus in Underworld: Evolution, T-600 in Terminator Salvation, Berzerker Predator in Predators, and a Bigfoot in the Eduardo Sánchez horror-thriller film Exists.

Personal life

Filmography

References

External links
 (archived by archive.is) official website
 

American male film actors
Living people
Male actors from Michigan
People from Milford, Michigan
1963 births